Hellmuth Straka (March 31, 1922 – March 17, 1987) was an Austrian archaeologist.

1922 births
1987 deaths
Austrian archaeologists
20th-century archaeologists